Marc Kocher (* 1965 in Bern) is a Swiss architect, known for his residential building designs.

Life 

Studying architecture at the Swiss Federal Institute of Technology in Zurich (1984-1989), Kocher started working for Italian architect Aldo Rossi in Milan and continued from 1989 until Rossi's death in 1997, becoming Rossi's junior-partner.

In 1995 Kocher founded his own office in Munich, later moving to Zurich (1997).

In 1998/99, Kocher was an assistant at ETH Zürich, and in 1999 and 2000 guest professor at Syracuse University.

In 2012 he opened an office in Berlin.

Kocher lives and works in Berlin and Zurich. He is married and has two children.

Architectural work
Marc Kocher is considered a representative of postmodern neoclassicism as well as New Urbanism architecture, combining contemporary building with elements of classical European urban architecture. Like his teacher Aldo Rossi, Kocher does architectural drawings by hand.

While working with Rossi (1989-1997) Kocher was involved in the design of Milan Linate International Airport's new Terminal, and the Bonnefantenmuseum in Maastricht.

As of 1998, Kocher continued planning the reconstruction of the Venetian opera house Teatro La Fenice, originally commenced by Aldo Rossi. Kocher was responsible for the reconstruction of the interior, especially of the sophisticated wall and ceiling decoration.

In 2000, Kocher was commissioned to transform the Backfabrik, a historic industrial building complex in the Prenzlauer Allee in Berlin, into a modern office and commercial location. In subsequent years, Kocher realized a series of original residential and commercial buildings and refurbished projects for existing structures, primarily in Berlin, but also in Austria, Switzerland and Italy.

Selected projects 
 Linate International Airport, Milan, Italy (1991) - with Aldo Rossi
 Bonnefantenmuseum, Maastricht, Netherlands (1992–94) - with Aldo Rossi
 Commercial building in Dirksenstraße at the corner of Hackescher Markt, Berlin, Germany (1998)
 Office and commercial building Backfabrik, Berlin, Germany (2001)
 Design for reconstruction of Berlin Palace (2002)
 Reconstruction of the Gran Teatro La Fenice, Venice, Italy (2004)
 Residential and commercial building Müller-Martini-Areal, Zurich, Switzerland (2006)
 Residential ensemble "Palais KolleBelle", Berlin, Germany (2009)
 Residential building "Fellini Residences", Berlin, Germany (2013)
 Residential and commercial building Entrée Weißensee, Berlin, Germany (2018)

Bibliography 
 
 Marc Kocher: Bauten und Projekte, foreword by Prof. Helmut Geisert, Berlin 2019

Literature

References

External links 
 

1965 births
Living people
ETH Zurich alumni
New Classical architects
20th-century Swiss architects
People from Bern
21st-century Swiss architects